Neunkirchen District may refer to:
Neunkirchen District, Austria, "Bezirk Neunkirchen" a district in Lower Austria
Neunkirchen (German district), "Kreis Neunkirchen" a rural district (Landkreis) in Saarland, Germany

nl:Neunkirchen (district)